Call Me Mother is a Canadian reality television series, which premiered on OutTV in 2021. Hosted by Entertainment Tonight Canada reporter Dallas Dixon, the series is a drag competition which will see up-and-coming drag performers join one of three drag houses to compete in group challenges, with one drag artist eliminated each week until the winner of the competition is crowned the "First Child of Drag".

The series is distinct from the RuPaul's Drag Race franchise in adding a drag mother mentoring and coaching team aspect similar to The Voice or The X Factor, and is also a fully inclusive competition featuring drag queens, drag kings, transgender and non-binary drag artists.

The houses are led by established drag queens Peppermint (House of Dulcet), Crystal (House of Glass) and Barbada de Barbades (House of Harmonie). Ontario drag queen Farra N. Hyte, the drag mother of RuPaul's Drag Race competitor and Canada's Drag Race judge Brooke Lynn Hytes, and Québec drag queen Miss Butterfly serve as "aunties", who provide additional support and feedback but do not directly "mother" their own teams. Hyte and Dixon were also the co-hosts of a weekly companion podcast which included post-elimination interviews with the competing artists.

Miss Butterfly did not return as an "auntie" for the second season, and was replaced by past Dragula winner Landon Cider.

Call Me Mother was created by RedFlame TV, and produced in Canada by Go Button Media and RedFlame TV. It was shot in North Bay, Ontario in early 2021.

The series premiered with its first season on October 25, 2021. The first season was won by Toddy, a non-binary drag performer from Vancouver, British Columbia. A second season was announced on December 15, set to be released in 2022.

Production

Season 1

Casting occurred in the early months of 2021, with production starting in late spring 2021. The final cast was announced on October 5 2021. The inaugural season consisted of eight episodes.

Season 2

On December 15, two days after the first season finale, OutTV announced the renewal of the series for a second season following the success of the first. Casting for the second season opened on February 16, 2022. The official cast was announced on September 22, 2022 with a premiere date of October 26.

Mothers and other figures
On June 3, 2021, it was announced that Peppermint, Crystal and Barbada would be leading the series as the mothers to the competing drag houses. Dallas Dixon was also announced as the host. It was later revealed that Farra N. Hyte and Miss Butterfly would be joining the series as aunties. When the official cast for season 2 was announced, it was confirmed that Peppermint, Crystal and Barbada would be returning as the mothers for the second season and that Dallas Dixon would be returning as the host. On September 30, 2022, it was revealed that Farra N. Hyte would be returning as an auntie and a judge, and would be joined by Dragula season 3 winner Landon Cider taking the role of "guncle" and judge.

Series overview

Reception
The series was the highest-rated original production in OutTV's history for Season 1.

References

External links

2020s Canadian LGBT-related television series
Drag (clothing) television shows
OutTV (Canadian TV channel) original programming
Television shows filmed in North Bay, Ontario
2021 Canadian television series debuts
2020s Canadian reality television series
2020s LGBT-related reality television series
Canadian LGBT-related reality television series